Arnaud Clément defeated Mario Ančić 7–5, 6–4 to win the 2006 Open 13 singles competition. Joachim Johansson was the champion but did not defend his title.

Seeds

  Rafael Nadal (semifinals)
  Ivan Ljubičić (quarterfinals)
  Nikolay Davydenko (second round)
  Thomas Johansson (first round)
  Richard Gasquet (first round)
  Mario Ančić (final)
  Radek Štěpánek (second round)
  Sébastien Grosjean (semifinals)

Draw

Finals

Top half

Bottom half

External links
Association of Tennis Professionals (ATP) draw
Association of Tennis Professionals (ATP) Qualifying draw

Singles
2006 ATP Tour
Open 13